Harilaos Perpessas (Greek: Χαρίλαος Περπέσσας) (10 May 1907 — 19 October 1995) was a Greek composer of the Postmodern Era.

Life and career
Born to Greek parents in Leipzig, Germany, Perpessas studied with Arnold Schoenberg in Berlin but opposed his compositional methods. There he met Nikos Skalkottas. He immigrated to Greece in 1934 where he lived for the next 14 years; enjoying success as a composer. The conductor Dimitri Mitropoulos was a champion of his works.  In 1948 he moved to New York City where he lived in seclusion until moving again to a residential home in Sharon, Massachusetts in 1992. He died there in 1995.

As a composer, Perpessas is regarded as one of the earliest Greek composers to move away from Greek nationalism; often being grouped with Mitropoulos and Skalkottas in that regard. His orchestral works display chromatic polyphony and wide leaping melodic lines with dramatic climaxes which demonstrate influences from Debussy, Mahler, Ravel and Strauss. He often kept revising his works withholding them from publication.

Works
Orchestral: Dionysos Dithyramben (before 1934); Prelude and Fugue in C (1935, rev. 1970s); Symphony No. 2 (1936–37), completed as Sym. `Christus', 1948–50; Symphonic Variations on Beethoven's Eighth Symphony, 1953–60; orchestration of J.S. Bach: Die Kunst der Fuge (1953–56);

Other works: Piano Sonata, (1928–32, destroyed); String Quartet (1928–32, destroyed); Restoration, tetralogy, 1963–73: The Song of the Concentration Camp [= Prelude and Fugue, 1935], The Opening of the Seventh Seal (Liberation) (Hippolytus: Philosophumena), Conjunction, The Infinite Bliss.

References

Sources
The New Grove Dictionary of Music and Musicians
P.E. Gradenwitz: 'Requiem to a Forgotten Composer', The Athenian, no. 272 (1996), 16–18
S.D. Heliadelis: 'Harilaos Perpessas, o agnostos Siatistinos klassikos synthetis ke philosophos' [Harilaos Perpessas, the unknown classical composer and philosopher from Siatista], Elymiaka [Salonica], no. 43 (1999), 93–110

1907 births
1995 deaths
Greek classical composers
Greek musicians
20th-century composers
German emigrants to Greece
Greek emigrants to the United States
Musicians from Leipzig